Vostok is a rural locality (a village) in Isheyevsky Selsoviet, Ishimbaysky District, Bashkortostan, Russia. The population was 223 as of 2010. There are 5 streets.

Geography 
Vostok is located 23 km north of Ishimbay (the district's administrative centre) by road. Yangi-Aul is the nearest rural locality.

References 

Rural localities in Ishimbaysky District